WNCG-LP (95.7 FM) is a radio station broadcasting a college radio format. Licensed to Mansfield, Ohio, United States, the station is currently owned by North Central State College.

References

External links
 

NCG-LP
NCG-LP
NCG-LP